Miss Universe Colombia 2021 was the second edition of the Miss Universe Colombia pageant, held on October 18, 2021 in Bogotá, Colombia. Laura Olascuaga of Bolívar crowned Valeria Ayos of Cartagena as her successor at the end of the event.

She represented Colombia at the Miss Universe 2021 competition and placed Top 5.

Results 

* Voted into Top 13 by viewers.

Miss Universe Colombia 2022
The Miss Universe Colombia 2022 was appointed by the organization to represent Colombia at Miss Universe 2022.

Contestants 
24 delegates have been selected:

Judges 
 Olivia Quido – Businesswoman, Jury president
 Luis Alfonso Borrego – Television presenter
 Alexander González Aguilar – Pageant coach
 Bárbara de Regil – Actress
 Luisa Fernanda W – Influencer

Notes

References 

Beauty pageants in Colombia
2021 beauty pageants
2021 in Colombia
October 2021 events in Colombia